Vabole Station is a railway station serving the settlement of Vabole in the Latgale region of Latvia. It is located on the Riga – Daugavpils Railway.

References 

Railway stations in Latvia
Augšdaugava Municipality
Railway stations opened in 1931
Latgale